The Yakovlev Yak-112 Filin (Owl) is a Russian/Soviet civil utility aircraft that first flew in 1992. It is an all-metal high-wing strut braced monoplane with fixed tricycle landing gear.

Specifications (Yak-112)

References

External links

Yaklovlev English page on Yak-112

1990s Soviet and Russian civil utility aircraft
High-wing aircraft
Single-engined tractor aircraft
Aircraft first flown in 1992